Red FM (Often stylized as Superhits 93.5 RED FM) is an Indian FM radio network headquartered in Chennai and owned by Chennai-based Sun Group. The network broadcasts content in various Indian languages including Hindi, Urdu, Bengali, Telugu, Kannada and Malayalam. On 14 August 2009, Suryan FM 93.5 was rebranded to RED FM in 64 cities across India. Thus, Sun Group's FM service came to be known with brand name RED FM across India except Tamil Nadu.

Radio jockeys and their shows

Locations served 

- It serves as Suryan FM in 10 Cities across Tamilnadu.

- It serves as Magic FM in Hyderabad and Mumbai (sister channels to Red FM).

- It serves as Red FM in more than 57 cities across the country listed below.

Agartala, TR (broadcast on 95.0 MHz)
Ahmedabad, GJ
Aizawl, MZ
Amritsar, PB
Asansol, WB
Ayodhya, UP
Aurangabad, MH
Bengaluru, KA
Bhopal, MP
Bhubaneswar-Cuttack, OD
Chandigarh Tricity
Delhi NCR
Dehradun, UK
Dhule, MH
Gangtok, SK
Gulbarga, KA
Guwahati, AS
Hubli-Dharwad, KA
Hyderabad, TS
Indore, MP
Jabalpur, MP
Jaipur, RJ
Jammu, JK (broadcast on 91.9 MHz)
Jamshedpur, JH
Jhansi, UP (broadcast on 106.4 MHz)
Jodhpur, RJ
Kannur, KL
Kanpur, UP
Kochi, KL
Kolkata, WB
Kozhikode, KL
Leh, LA
Lucknow, UP
Mangalore, KA
Mumbai, MH
Muzaffarpur, BR
Mysuru, KA
Nagpur, MH
Nanded, MH
Nashik, MH
Nellore, AP
Patna, BR
Prayagraj, UP
Pune, MH
Rajahmundry, AP
Rajkot, GJ
Shillong, ML
Siliguri, WB
Srinagar, JK
Surat, GJ (broadcast on 95.0 MHz)
Thrissur, KL (broadcast on 95.0 Mhz)
Tirupati, AP
Thiruvananthapuram, KL
Udaipur, RJ
Vadodara, GJ
Varanasi, UP
Vijayawada, AP
Visakhapatnam, AP
Warangal, TS

References

Radio stations in Kolkata

External links
 Red FM Delhi
 Red FM Mumbai
 Red FM Bengaluru
 Suryan FM 93.5

Radio stations in Kerala
Telugu-language radio stations
Radio stations in Hyderabad
Radio stations in Indore
Radio stations in Bhopal
Radio stations in Ujjain
Radio stations established in 2002
2002 establishments in Tamil Nadu
Sun Group
Radio stations in Gujarat
Radio stations in Patna
Radio stations in Muzaffarpur
Radio stations in Assam
Radio stations in Vijayawada